J. Bernard Hogg (1908–1994) was an American labor historian.

Hogg was the first chairman of the former Shippensburg State College's history/philosophy department and also taught at Indiana University.

Hogg graduated from Slippery Rock University and the University of Pittsburgh and the University of Chicago.

Publications 
Hogg's Ph.D. dissertation at the University of Chicago in 1943 was “The Homestead Strike of 1892."

"Public Reaction to Pinkertonism and the Labor Question," published in Pennsylvania History: A Journal of Mid-Atlantic Studies 11, no. 3 (July 1944), pages 171—199.

The Presbyterian Church of Shippensburg, 1798-1984 : a changing church in a changing world, published 1984

The Allegheny Society of American Foresters : a seventy-five year history, 1922-1997 / J Bernard Hogg;  Ronald J Sheay, 1997

Honors
The class of 1949 at Shippensburg University established a Dr. J. Bernard Hogg Memorial Scholarship fund.

See also 

 The Homestead Strike
 The Pinkerton National Detective Agency
 Labor spies

References 

Labor historians
1908 births
1994 deaths
20th-century American historians
20th-century American male writers
American male non-fiction writers